The arrondissement of Pau is an arrondissement of France in the Pyrénées-Atlantiques department in the Nouvelle-Aquitaine region. It has 269 communes.

Composition

The communes of the arrondissement of Pau, and their INSEE codes, are:

 Aast (64001)
 Abère (64002)
 Abidos (64003)
 Abos (64005)
 Andoins (64021)
 Angaïs (64023)
 Anos (64027)
 Anoye (64028)
 Arbus (64037)
 Aressy (64041)
 Argagnon (64042)
 Argelos (64043)
 Arget (64044)
 Arnos (64048)
 Arricau-Bordes (64052)
 Arrien (64053)
 Arros-de-Nay (64054)
 Arrosès (64056)
 Arthez-d'Asson (64058)
 Arthez-de-Béarn (64057)
 Artigueloutan (64059)
 Artiguelouve (64060)
 Artix (64061)
 Arzacq-Arraziguet (64063)
 Assat (64067)
 Asson (64068)
 Astis (64070)
 Aubertin (64072)
 Aubin (64073)
 Aubous (64074)
 Auga (64077)
 Auriac (64078)
 Aurions-Idernes (64079)
 Aussevielle (64080)
 Aydie (64084)
 Baigts-de-Béarn (64087)
 Balansun (64088)
 Baleix (64089)
 Baliracq-Maumusson (64090)
 Baliros (64091)
 Barinque (64095)
 Barzun (64097)
 Bassillon-Vauzé (64098)
 Baudreix (64101)
 Bédeille (64103)
 Bellocq (64108)
 Bénéjacq (64109)
 Bentayou-Sérée (64111)
 Bernadets (64114)
 Bésingrand (64117)
 Bétracq (64118)
 Beuste (64119)
 Beyrie-en-Béarn (64121)
 Billère (64129)
 Biron (64131)
 Bizanos (64132)
 Boeil-Bezing (64133)
 Bonnut (64135)
 Bordères (64137)
 Bordes (64138)
 Bosdarros (64139)
 Boueilh-Boueilho-Lasque (64141)
 Bougarber (64142)
 Bouillon (64143)
 Boumourt (64144)
 Bourdettes (64145)
 Bournos (64146)
 Bruges-Capbis-Mifaget (64148)
 Buros (64152)
 Burosse-Mendousse (64153)
 Cabidos (64158)
 Cadillon (64159)
 Cardesse (64165)
 Carrère (64167)
 Casteide-Cami (64171)
 Casteide-Candau (64172)
 Casteide-Doat (64173)
 Castéra-Loubix (64174)
 Castétis (64177)
 Castetner (64179)
 Castetpugon (64180)
 Castillon (Canton of Arthez-de-Béarn) (64181)
 Castillon (Canton of Lembeye) (64182)
 Caubios-Loos (64183)
 Cescau (64184)
 Claracq (64190)
 Coarraze (64191)
 Conchez-de-Béarn (64192)
 Corbère-Abères (64193)
 Coslédaà-Lube-Boast (64194)
 Coublucq (64195)
 Crouseilles (64196)
 Cuqueron (64197)
 Denguin (64198)
 Diusse (64199)
 Doazon (64200)
 Doumy (64203)
 Escoubès (64208)
 Escurès (64210)
 Eslourenties-Daban (64211)
 Espéchède (64212)
 Espoey (64216)
 Fichous-Riumayou (64226)
 Gabaston (64227)
 Gan (64230)
 Garlède-Mondebat (64232)
 Garlin (64233)
 Garos (64234)
 Gayon (64236)
 Gelos (64237)
 Ger (64238)
 Gerderest (64239)
 Géus-d'Arzacq (64243)
 Gomer (64246)
 Hagetaubin (64254)
 Haut-de-Bosdarros (64257)
 Higuères-Souye (64262)
 Hours (64266)
 Idron (64269)
 Igon (64270)
 Jurançon (64284)
 Laà-Mondrans (64286)
 Labastide-Cézéracq (64288)
 Labastide-Monréjeau (64290)
 Labatmale (64292)
 Labatut-Figuières (64293)
 Labeyrie (64295)
 Lacadée (64296)
 Lacommande (64299)
 Lacq (64300)
 Lagor (64301)
 Lagos (64302)
 Lahourcade (64306)
 Lalongue (64307)
 Lalonquette (64308)
 Lamayou (64309)
 Lannecaube (64311)
 Lanneplaà (64312)
 Laroin (64315)
 Larreule (64318)
 Lasclaveries (64321)
 Lasserre (64323)
 Lée (64329)
 Lembeye (64331)
 Lème (64332)
 Lescar (64335)
 Lespielle (64337)
 Lespourcy (64338)
 Lestelle-Bétharram (64339)
 Limendous (64343)
 Livron (64344)
 Lombia (64346)
 Lonçon (64347)
 Lons (64348)
 Loubieng (64349)
 Lourenties (64352)
 Louvigny (64355)
 Luc-Armau (64356)
 Lucarré (64357)
 Lucgarier (64358)
 Lucq-de-Béarn (64359)
 Lussagnet-Lusson (64361)
 Malaussanne (64365)
 Mascaraàs-Haron (64366)
 Maslacq (64367)
 Maspie-Lalonquère-Juillacq (64369)
 Maucor (64370)
 Maure (64372)
 Mazères-Lezons (64373)
 Mazerolles (64374)
 Meillon (64376)
 Méracq (64380)
 Mesplède (64382)
 Mialos (64383)
 Miossens-Lanusse (64385)
 Mirepeix (64386)
 Momas (64387)
 Momy (64388)
 Monassut-Audiracq (64389)
 Moncaup (64390)
 Moncla (64392)
 Monein (64393)
 Monpezat (64394)
 Monségur (64395)
 Mont (64396)
 Montagut (64397)
 Montaner (64398)
 Montardon (64399)
 Montaut (64400)
 Mont-Disse (64401)
 Morlaàs (64405)
 Morlanne (64406)
 Mouhous (64408)
 Mourenx (64410)
 Narcastet (64413)
 Navailles-Angos (64415)
 Nay (64417)
 Noguères (64418)
 Nousty (64419)
 Orthez (64430)
 Os-Marsillon (64431)
 Ouillon (64438)
 Ousse (64439)
 Ozenx-Montestrucq (64440)
 Parbayse (64442)
 Pardies (64443)
 Pardies-Piétat (64444)
 Pau (64445)
 Peyrelongue-Abos (64446)
 Piets-Plasence-Moustrou (64447)
 Poey-de-Lescar (64448)
 Pomps (64450)
 Ponson-Debat-Pouts (64451)
 Ponson-Dessus (64452)
 Pontacq (64453)
 Pontiacq-Viellepinte (64454)
 Portet (64455)
 Pouliacq (64456)
 Poursiugues-Boucoue (64457)
 Puyoô (64461)
 Ramous (64462)
 Ribarrouy (64464)
 Riupeyrous (64465)
 Rontignon (64467)
 Saint-Abit (64469)
 Saint-Armou (64470)
 Saint-Boès (64471)
 Saint-Castin (64472)
 Saint-Faust (64478)
 Saint-Girons-en-Béarn (64479)
 Saint-Jammes (64482)
 Saint-Jean-Poudge (64486)
 Saint-Laurent-Bretagne (64488)
 Saint-Médard (64491)
 Saint-Vincent (64498)
 Salles-Mongiscard (64500)
 Sallespisse (64501)
 Samsons-Lion (64503)
 Sarpourenx (64505)
 Saubole (64507)
 Sault-de-Navailles (64510)
 Sauvagnon (64511)
 Sauvelade (64512)
 Séby (64514)
 Sedze-Maubecq (64515)
 Sedzère (64516)
 Séméacq-Blachon (64517)
 Sendets (64518)
 Serres-Castet (64519)
 Serres-Morlaàs (64520)
 Serres-Sainte-Marie (64521)
 Sévignacq (64523)
 Simacourbe (64524)
 Siros (64525)
 Soumoulou (64526)
 Tadousse-Ussau (64532)
 Taron-Sadirac-Viellenave (64534)
 Tarsacq (64535)
 Thèze (64536)
 Urdès (64541)
 Urost (64544)
 Uzan (64548)
 Uzein (64549)
 Uzos (64550)
 Vialer (64552)
 Viellenave-d'Arthez (64554)
 Vielleségure (64556)
 Vignes (64557)
 Viven (64560)

History

The arrondissement of Pau was created in 1800. At the January 2017 reorganisation of the arrondissements of Pyrénées-Atlantiques, it gained 11 communes from the arrondissement of Oloron-Sainte-Marie, and it lost 11 communes to the arrondissement of Oloron-Sainte-Marie.

As a result of the reorganisation of the cantons of France which came into effect in 2015, the borders of the cantons are no longer related to the borders of the arrondissements. The cantons of the arrondissement of Pau were, as of January 2015:

 Arthez-de-Béarn
 Arzacq-Arraziguet
 Billère
 Garlin
 Jurançon
 Lagor
 Lembeye
 Lescar
 Montaner
 Morlaàs
 Nay-Est
 Nay-Ouest
 Orthez
 Pau-Centre
 Pau-Est
 Pau-Nord
 Pau-Ouest
 Pau-Sud
 Pontacq
 Salies-de-Béarn
 Thèze

References

Pau